A by-election was held for the Dewan Rakyat seat of P67 Kuala Kangsar, a parliamentary seat located in the state of Perak, Malaysia on 18 June 2016 following the nomination day on 5 June 2016. The seat fell vacant after death of member of parliament Wan Mohammad Khair-il Anuar Wan Ahmad, who died in a helicopter crash on May 5, 2016 while campaigning in the Sarawak state election. In the 2013 general election, Wan Mohammad Khair-il Anuar Wan Ahmad won the seat with a majority of 1,082 votes beating Khalil Idham Lim Abdullah of Pan-Malaysian Islamic Party (PAS) and independent candidate Kamilia Ibrahim. This by-election was held concurrently with the Sungai Besar by-election for the same reason.

The Barisan Nasional candidate for Kuala Kangsar was United Malays National Organisation (UMNO) member Mastura Mohd Yazid who is the widow of the former MP Wan Mohammad Khair-il Anuar Wan Ahmad. The PAS candidate chosen was Najihatussalehah Ahmad. The opposition coalition Pakatan Harapan chose National Trust Party (AMANAH) vice chairman Ahmad Termizi Ramli as their candidate. Izat Bukhary Ismail Bukhary joined the race as an Independent on the nomination day.

Results 
Mastura Mohd Yazid managed to retain the seat for Barisan Nasional with a majority of 6,969 votes beating 3 other candidates.

References 

Politics of Perak
2016 elections in Malaysia
2016 Kuala Kangsar by-election
Elections in Perak